Andersen (born January 9, 1974) is a Danish racing cyclist. She was junior national champion in road bicycle racing, but her specialty is mountain biking, where she also has been national champion. She has been riding for Dansk Mountainbike Klub and Team SATS. She has a BA in media science from Copenhagen University.

References 
Portræt af mountain-bikeren Mette Andersen

1974 births
Living people
Danish mountain bikers
Danish female cyclists
Cyclists at the 2004 Summer Olympics
Olympic cyclists of Denmark
University of Copenhagen alumni
Place of birth missing (living people)